The 3rd Women's Boat Race took place in 1930. The contest was between crews from the Universities of Oxford and Cambridge and held on the River Thames.

Background
The first Women's Boat Race was conducted on The Isis in 1927.

Race
The contest was won by Cambridge, with the victory taking the overall record in the competition to 2–1 in their favour.

See also
The Boat Race 1930

References

External links
 Official website

Women's Boat Race
1930 in English sport
Boat
Boat
1930 sports events in London